St Gregory's Catholic Science College is a coeducational Roman Catholic secondary school and sixth form located in the Kenton area of the London Borough of Brent, England. It is located near the border of the London Borough of Harrow, and accepts pupils from both boroughs.

The school has had great success in recent years, offering highly valued GCSEs such as statistics and business studies with most of its students achieving 70% A-A*.

Although predominantly Roman Catholic, the school accepts some pupils from other religions too, But mainly followers of catholicism.

Previously a voluntary aided school, in January 2016 St Gregory's Catholic Science College converted to academy status and is now sponsored by the All Saints' Trust.

Notable former pupils
Stephanie Fearon, actress 
Ricky German, footballer 
Luke Mbete, footballer

References

External links
St Gregory's Catholic Science College official website

Secondary schools in the London Borough of Harrow
Catholic secondary schools in the Archdiocese of Westminster
Kenton, London
Academies in the London Borough of Harrow